Fallen Angel is the 12th studio album by British rock band Uriah Heep, released in September 1978 by Bronze Records in the UK and Chrysalis Records in USA. It is the last album to feature John Lawton on vocals, before his firing in 1979. Fallen Angel only reached No. 186 in the US Billboard 200, but in Germany, the band were at the height of their popularity. On this album, the band moved toward an AOR sound, as opposed to the progressive rock of previous albums.

The album was remastered and reissued by Castle Communications in 1997 with four bonus tracks, and again in 2004 in an expanded deluxe edition.

Artwork
The album was originally released in a gatefold sleeve, opening vertically rather than the customary horizontal axis. The lyrics were printed on the LP liner. The artwork was licensed from artist Chris Achilleos. Achilleos's website lists the original artwork as missing. The same artist designed the cover for the Whitesnake album Lovehunter a year later.

Track listings

US track listing
 "One More Night"
 "Falling in Love"
 "Woman of the Night"
 "I'm Alive"
 "Come Back to Me"
 "Whad'ya Say"
 "Save It"
 "Love or Nothing"
 "Put Your Lovin' on Me"
 "Fallen Angel"

Personnel 
Uriah Heep
 Mick Box – electric and acoustic guitars
 Ken Hensley – keyboards, synthesizers, slide and acoustic guitars, backing vocals
 Lee Kerslake – drums, Syndrums, backing vocals
 Trevor Bolder – bass guitar
 John Lawton – lead and backing vocals

Additional musician
 Chris Mercer – saxophone on "Save It"

Production
 Gerry Bron, Ken Hensley – producers
 Peter Gallen – engineer
 John Gallen, Colin Bainbridge, Julian Cooper – assistant engineers

Charts

Album

Singles

References

1978 albums
Uriah Heep (band) albums
Albums produced by Gerry Bron
Bronze Records albums
Chrysalis Records albums